Spring Creek is a  long 3rd order tributary to Brokenstraw Creek.  It is classed as a High-quality cold-water fishery by the Pennsylvania Fish and Boat Commission.

Course
Spring Creek rises on the divide between it and East Branch Oil Creek in Warren County, Pennsylvania about 2 miles southwest of East Branch, Pennsylvania and flows northeast to meet Brokenstraw Creek south of Spring Creek, Pennsylvania.

Watershed
Spring Creek drains  of the Pennsylvania High Plateau province and the northwestern glaciated plateau and is underlaid by the Venango Formation. The watershed receives an average of 44.4 in/year of precipitation and has a wetness index of 437.71.  The watershed is about 64% forested.

See also 
 List of rivers of Pennsylvania

References

Rivers of Pennsylvania
Tributaries of the Allegheny River
Rivers of Warren County, Pennsylvania